David Leighton Davidson (4 June 1905 – 30 May 1969) was a Scottish professional footballer who played as a centre half.

Career
Born in Aberdeen in June 1905, Davidson played club football for Garthdee, Aberdeen Argyle, Forfar Athletic, Liverpool, Newcastle United, Hartlepools United and Gateshead.

References

1905 births
1969 deaths
Scottish footballers
Forfar Athletic F.C. players
Liverpool F.C. players
Newcastle United F.C. players
Hartlepool United F.C. players
Gateshead F.C. players
English Football League players
Association football defenders
Scottish Football League players
Footballers from Aberdeen
FA Cup Final players